"Clean Up Your Own Backyard" is a 1969 song recorded by Elvis Presley and released as a single. The song was featured in the Metro-Goldwyn-Mayer film The Trouble with Girls (and How to Get into It).

Background
Written by Mac Davis and Billy Strange and published by Gladys Music, Inc., it was released as a 7" single in 1969 with "The Fair Is Moving On" on the B-side, but not featured on any studio album. The single was also released in the UK, Canada, Germany, Australia, New Zealand, and India.

It reached #35 on the Billboard Hot 100 and #21 on the UK Singles Chart. The single reached #18 on the Record World chart and #27 on the Australian Go-Set chart. The RIAA certified the single Gold in March 1992.

The song was from the soundtrack of the MGM film The Trouble with Girls, and was later included on the budget RCA Camden album Almost In Love.

Although The Trouble with Girls is set in the 1920s, several lyrics within this song are anachronistic for the era, such as a reference to "armchair quarterbacks", a term not coined until the advent of television sports broadcasting decades later.

Chart history

Other recordings
The song has been recorded by Nat Stuckey, O.C. Smith, Tom Green, Jennifer Scott, Sue Moreno, Darrel Higham and The Enforcers, and Lee Birchfield in 2012.

References

Elvis Presley songs
1969 singles
Songs written by Mac Davis
Songs written by Billy Strange
1969 songs
Songs written for films
Anti-war songs
RCA Records singles